Vallelunga (Italian for long valley) is a valley, or plateau, near Campagnano di Roma, Italy.

See also 
 Vallelunga Circuit

References

Valleys of Lazio